The 1952-53 Oberliga season was the fifth season of the Oberliga, the top level of ice hockey in Germany. Eight teams participated in the league, and EV Füssen won the championship.

Regular season

Relegation 
Düsseldorfer EG – LTTC Rot-Weiß Berlin 14:3

References

Oberliga (ice hockey) seasons
West
Ger